The J Award of 2010 is the sixth annual J Awards, established by the Australian Broadcasting Corporation's youth-focused radio station Triple J. The announcement comes at the culmination of Ausmusic Month (November). For the third year, three awards were presented; Australian Album of the Year, Australian Music Video of the Year and Unearthed Artist of the Year. The announcement occurred on 30 November 2010.

Who's eligible? 
Any Australian album released independently or through a record company, or sent to Triple J in consideration for airplay, is eligible for the J Award. The 2010 nominations for Australian Album of the Year and Australian Music Video of the Year were selected from releases received by Triple J between November 2009 and October 2010. For Unearthed Artist of the Year it was open to any artist from the Unearthed (talent contest), who has had a ground breaking and impactful 12 months from November 2009 and October 2010.

Awards

Australian Album of the Year

Dom Alessio on Innerspeakersaid "Who needs drug trips when you've got Tame Impala? This album envelopes you with its dense guitars, rolling drums and swirling, psychedelic melodies. The attention to detail that Kevin & Co have on their debut is incredible. It's no surprise this album is getting rave reviews around the world."

Australian Video of the Year

Unearthed Artist of the Year

References

2010 in Australian music
2010 music awards
J Awards